Centratherum punctatum, also known by its common name Brazilian bachelor's button is a species of flowering plant from the genus Centratherum.

References

Vernonieae